Jawar is a village and a gram panchayat in Khandwa district in the Indian state of Madhya Pradesh.

Geography
It has an average elevation of 294 metres (964 feet).

Demographics
 India census, Jawar had a population of 7,131. Males constitute 52% of the population and females 48%. Jawar has an average literacy rate of 53%, lower than the national average of 59.5%: male literacy is 65%, and female literacy is 40%. In Jawar, 18% of the population is under 6 years of age.

References

Cities and towns in Sehore district
Sehore